This article lists various football records in relation to the Croatia national football team.

Individual records

Player records

Most capped players 

First player to reach 100 appearances

Dario Šimić, 20 August 2008, Slovenia 2–3 Croatia

Fastest player to reach 100 appearances

Ivan Perišić, 10 years 2 months 6 days, 26 March 2011 – 1 June 2021

Top goalscorers 

First goal

Florijan Matekalo, 2 April 1940, Croatia 4–0 Switzerland

Manager records

Managers results 
The following table provides a summary of the complete record of each Croatia manager including their results regarding World Cups and European Championships.

Last updated: Croatia vs. Morocco, 17 December 2022.

Source: Croatian Football Federation

Team records

Home matches 
Key: Pld–games played, W–games won, D–games drawn; L–games lost, %–win percentage

Last updated: Croatia vs. Denmark, 22 September 2022. Statistics include official FIFA-recognised matches only.

Competition records

FIFA World Cup

Croatia qualified for and competed in three consecutive World Cup tournaments between 1998 and 2006, but failed to qualify for the 2010 World Cup in South Africa after finishing 3rd in Group 6 behind England and Ukraine. Although they had joined both FIFA and UEFA by 1992, they were unable to enter the 1994 World Cup as qualification had started before the side was officially recognised as a state. In the following three World Cup groups they were eliminated after finishing third in all of them, before finally advancing further than the group stage at the 2018 World Cup. On 11 July 2018, Croatia won their semi-final match against England, advancing the national team to their first FIFA World Cup final wherein they secured second place as runners-up against winners France. Supplanting their third place positioning in 1998, this is the nation's best performance to date.

*Draws include knockout matches decided on penalty shoot-out; correct as of 17 December 2022 after the match against Morocco.

UEFA European Championship

*Draws include knockout matches decided on penalty kicks; correct as of 28 June 2021 after the match against Spain.

UEFA Nations League

*Draws include knockout matches decided on penalty kicks; correct as of 25 September 2022 after the match against Austria.

Head-to-head records 
The following table show the Croatia national football team's all-time international record. 

Only FIFA matches are counted. Correct as of 17 December 2022, after the 2022 FIFA World Cup fixture against Argentina.

Notes

See also
 Croatia national football team results

References

Football in Croatia
Croatian records
Croatia national football team records and statistics
National association football team records and statistics